Anthotroche myoporoides  is a plant species in the family Solanaceae, native to  Western Australia. It was first described in 1943 by Charles Gardner.

It is an intricately branched shrub, with white-cream-green flowers from August to January, and growing to heights of 60 cm to 3 m. on red or yellow sand.

References

External links
Anthotroche myoporoides occurrence data from GBIF

Solanaceae
Angiosperms of Western Australia
Plants described in 1943
Taxa named by Charles Gardner